Abdullah Abbas Nadwi (25 December 1925 – 1 January 2006) was an Indian Islamic scholar.

He was the author of the Vocabulary of the Holy Qur'an (1983). The entries are supplied with examples from Qur'an, searchable by 3-letter roots. He also authored Learn the Language of the Holy Qur'an (1987).

He was a prominent teacher of Darul Uloom Nadwatul Ulama. He also served in Jamia Ummul Qura University in Makkah as a teacher for several years.

References

External links
 Dr Abdullah Abbas Nadwi and His Works

2006 deaths
1925 births
Darul Uloom Nadwatul Ulama alumni
Indian Muslim scholars of Islam